Baeonoma holarga is a moth of the family Depressariidae. It is found in French Guiana.

The wingspan is about 19 mm. The forewings are white and the hindwings are light grey.

References

Moths described in 1916
Baeonoma
Moths of South America
Taxa named by Edward Meyrick